Enghien-les-Bains is a railway station in the commune of Enghien-les-Bains (Val-d'Oise department), France. The station is served by trains of the Transilien Paris Nord line H, from Paris to Pontoise and Persan-Beaumont. The daily number of passengers was between 7,500 and 15,000 in 2002.

History

The station was opened on July 11, 1846, by the Compagnie du Nord. Trains from Paris to Lille and the Belgian border stopped at the station twice every hour. After the construction of a more direct line between Saint-Denis and Creil in 1859, the station is mainly used for local traffic. Between 1866 and 1954 the station was also the terminus of a branch line to Montmorency, known as the Refoulons. Until 1935, it was the terminus for tramway lines to Montmorency and to la Trinité in Paris, 9th arr.

Between April and May 1969, the line Paris-Pontoise was electrified and automatic signals were installed.

Service

The station is served by 4 trains an hour (8 trains during peak hours) in both directions: Paris-Nord and Ermont-Eaubonne. It takes 9 to 15 minutes to reach Paris.

At the station, connection exists to the following bus services:
RATP: 154 and 256
R'Bus: 514
Valmy: 11, 13, 14, 15A, 15M, Blue (Bleue), Red (Rouge), Green (Verte)
Noctilien: N51

Gallery

See also
List of SNCF stations in Île-de-France

References

External links

 

Railway stations in Val-d'Oise
Railway stations in France opened in 1846